The 2001 Women's Pan American Cup was the 1st edition of the Women's Pan American Cup. It was held between 8 and 18 March 2001 in Kingston, Jamaica. The tournament doubled as the qualifier to the 2002 Hockey World Cup to be held in Perth, Australia. The winner would qualify directly while the teams ranked between 2nd and 4th would have the chance to obtain one of six berths at the World Cup Qualifier in Amiens and Abbeville, France.

Argentina won the tournament for the first time after defeating the United States 4–1 in the final, earning an automatic berth at the 2002 Hockey World Cup.

Format
Each of the seven teams plays each other once in a round-robin to complete six preliminary-round games. The top two teams at the end of the preliminary round will play the final, the third and fourth-placed teams play for the bronze medal, while the fifth and sixth-placed teams meet in the fifth-place playoff.

Umpires
Below are the 9 umpires appointed by the Pan American Hockey Federation:

 Rosario Ardanaz
 Leslie Austin
 Alison Hill
 Soledad Iparraguirre
 Lisa Marcano
 Deborah Olsen
 Mónica Rivera Fraga
 Alicia Takeda Hirata
 Ann van Dyk

Results
All times are Eastern Standard Time (UTC−05:00)

Preliminary round

Fixtures

Classification round

Fifth and sixth place

Third and fourth place

Final

Statistics

Final standings

Goalscorers

References

External links
Official website

Women's Pan American Cup
Pan American Cup
Pan American Cup
International field hockey competitions hosted by Jamaica
Pan American Cup
Sport in Kingston, Jamaica
21st century in Kingston, Jamaica